The Brave and the Bold is a 2006 collaborative studio album by Tortoise and Bonnie 'Prince' Billy. It was released on Overcoat Recordings. It consists of interpretations of ten songs originally by a wide range of musicians.

Critical reception

At Metacritic, which assigns a weighted average score out of 100 to reviews from mainstream critics, the album received an average score of 65, based on 28 reviews, indicating "generally favorable reviews".

Amanda Petrusich of Pitchfork gave the album a 5.4 out of 10, stating that "The Brave and the Bold is a collection of not-particularly-compelling cover songs, rolled out by two of contemporary indie's most uncompromising and rewarding forces." Michael J. Kramer of PopMatters gave the album 8 stars out of 10, calling it "a melding of the minds, a comic-book collision of musical forces whose mutant powers turn mere simulation into disturbing mimetic magic."

Track listing

Charts

References

External links
 

2006 albums
Collaborative albums
Tortoise (band) albums
Will Oldham albums
Domino Recording Company albums